This is a list of buildings and structures in the island of São Vicente, Cape Verde.

Mindelo
Centro Nacional de Artesanato e Design
Liceu Velho
Liceu Ludgero Lima
Pro-Cathedral of Our Lady of the Light, Mindelo
Paços do Concelho
Palácio do Povo
Fortim d'El-Rei
Estádio Municipal Adérito Sena

Elsewhere
Cesária Évora Airport, São Pedro
Farol de D. Amélia (Ponta Machado)
Farol de D. Luis (Ilhéu dos Passaros)

See also
List of buildings and structures in Cape Verde

References

Sao Vicente
São Vicente, Cape Verde